Allium neapolitanum is a bulbous herbaceous perennial plant in the onion subfamily within the Amaryllis family. Common names include Neapolitan garlic, Naples garlic, daffodil garlic, false garlic, flowering onion, Naples onion, Guernsey star-of-Bethlehem, star, white garlic, and wood garlic.

Its native range extends across the Mediterranean Region from Portugal to Turkey. The species is cultivated as an ornamental and has become naturalized in many areas, including Pakistan, Australia, New Zealand, and in southern and western parts of the United States. It is classed as an invasive species in parts of the U.S., and is found primarily in the U.S. states of California, Texas, Louisiana, and Florida.

The inflorescence is an umbel of up to 25 white flowers with yellow anthers.

Allium neapolitanum seems to have beta-adrenergic antagonist properties.

Gallery

References

External links
 

neapolitanum
Garlic
Plants described in 1788
Flora of Southwestern Europe
Flora of Southeastern Europe
Flora of Egypt
Flora of Libya
Flora of Western Asia
Garden plants